The 1987–88 Yugoslav Second League season was the 42nd season of the Second Federal League, the second level association football competition of SFR Yugoslavia, since its establishment in 1946. The league was contested in two regional groups (West Division and East Division), with 18 clubs each. This was the last season under that format as the following season featured unified second league with 20 clubs.

West Division

Teams
A total of eighteen teams contested the league, including twelve sides from the 1986–87 season, two clubs relegated from the 1985–86 Yugoslav First League and four sides promoted from the Inter-Republic Leagues played in the 1986–87 season. The league was contested in a double round robin format, with each club playing every other club twice, for a total of 34 rounds. Two points were awarded for wins and one point for draws.

Dinamo Vinkovci and Spartak Subotica were relegated from the 1986–87 Yugoslav First League after finishing in the bottom two places of the league table. The four clubs promoted to the second level were Borac Travnik, Kabel, Olimpija Ljubljana and Šparta Beli Manastir. At the end of season, Olimpija Ljubljana was spared from relegation as representative of Slovenia.

League table

East Division

Teams
A total of eighteen teams contested the league, including fourteen sides from the 1986–87 season and four sides promoted from the Inter-Republic Leagues played in the 1986–87 season. The league was contested in a double round robin format, with each club playing every other club twice, for a total of 34 rounds. Two points were awarded for wins and one point for draws.

There were no teams relegated from the 1986–87 Yugoslav First League. The four clubs promoted to the second level were Liria, Mačva Šabac, Metalurg Skopje and OFK Titograd.

League table

See also
1987–88 Yugoslav First League
1987–88 Yugoslav Cup

Yugoslav Second League seasons
Yugo
2